Virgil is the most common modern English name used for the Roman poet Publius Vergilius Maro (70–19 BC). It functions as a given name or surname made popular by the fame of Virgil. The variant form of this name is Vergil.

Notable people with the name Virgil include:


As a given name
St. Virgil of Salzburg (aka Vergilius/Vigil/Fearghal/Fergal), an eighth-century Irish bishop who believed the earth was round and was accused of believing in "men living under the earth"
Virgil Abloh (1980–2021), an American fashion designer and founder of fashion label Off-White
Virgil Aldrich (1903–1998), an American philosopher
Virgil I. Bărbat (1879–1931), Romanian sociologist
Virgil Bărbuceanu (1927–2004), Romanian equestrian
Virgil Bernero, mayor of Lansing, Michigan
Virgil Bogue (1846–1916), municipal planning director of Seattle
Virgil Carianopol (1908–1984), Romanian poet
Virgil Donati (born 1958), an Australian drummer
Virgil Earp (1843–1905), an American city marshal of Tombstone, Arizona
Virgil Exner (1909–1973), an American automobile designer
Virgil Finlay (1914–1971), a science fiction illustrator
Virgil Fox (1912–1980), American organist
Virgil Franklin Partch, an American gag cartoonist
Virgil Gheorghiu (disambiguation)
Virgil Goode (born 1946), a member of U.S. House of Representatives, 1997–2009
Virgil Griffith (born 1983), the creator of the Wikipedia Scanner
Virgil Alexis Griffith (1874–1953), justice of the Supreme Court of Mississippi
Virgil Hill (born 1964), an American boxer
Virgil Patrick Pat Hughes (sportscaster) (born 1955), an American sportscaster
Virgil Ivan Gus Grissom (1926–1967), an American astronaut and one of the first to die in the U.S. space program
Virgilius Maro Grammaticus, a medieval writer known as "Virgil the Grammarian"
Virgil Moorefield (born 1956), an American drummer and composer
Virgil Walter Ross (1907–1996), American artist, cartoonist, and animator best known for his work on the Warner Bros. animated shorts.
Virgil Runnels, Jr., real name of Dusty Rhodes (wrestler) (born 1945), an American professional wrestler
Virgil Oliver Stamps (1892–1940), a shape note singer and composer
Virgil Parker or Tony Parker (born 1993), American basketball player
Virgil Severns (born 1929), an American high jumper
Virgil Thomson (1896–1989), an American composer and music critic
Virgil van Dijk (born 1991), a Dutch footballer 
Virgil Williams, American television writer
Virgil Young Cook (1848–1922), American Confederate veteran and planter
Virgil (wrestler), stage name of Mike Jones (born 1962), an American professional wrestler
Virgil (Anxiety) ,Sanders fictional character from Sanders Sides

As a surname 
Alto Virgil (born 1982), British-American basketball player
Antha Minerva Virgil (1855-1939), American composer, journalist, and inventor
Jalen Virgil (born 1998), American football player
Lawrence Virgil (born 1990), American football player
Ozzie Virgil Jr. (born 1956), Puerto Rican baseball player
Ozzie Virgil Sr. (born 1932), Dominican Republic baseball player
Pedro Virgil, Australian photographer
Polydore Vergil (1470–1555), an Italian-born scholar and historian of England

English-language masculine given names
Romanian masculine given names